Varli or Warli is an Indo-Aryan language spoken by the Warli people. The language is usually classified as Marathi, but sometimes as Konkani or Bhil.

References

External links
 Varli Phonology and Grammar Sketches Varli Phonology and Grammar Sketches (archive.org)
 
Southern Indo-Aryan languages
Culture of Maharashtra
Konkani languages
Marathi_language